Colt is a cigarette brand that was owned and manufactured by Philip Morris USA. In Finland, it is owned and manufactured by Imperial Tobacco Finland Oy, a subsidiary of Imperial Tobacco.

History

Colt was launched in 1964 and it was originally a tobacco factory. However, the company merged with Oy Rettig-Strengberg Ab. in 1976 in Finland. Colt was once Finland's best-selling cigarette brand, but eventually Marlboro and L&M surpassed the brand in terms of sales. The brand was also manufactured and sold in the United States by Philip Morris USA.

Besides cigarettes, cigarette lighters are also sold.

Various poster advertisements were made in Finnish to promote the Colt brand.

Sport sponsorship
Colt cigarettes sponsored the Finnish rally driver Henri Toivonen from 1979 until 1985, as well as the team he drove called “Colt Racing Team”.

Markets
Colt is mainly sold in Finland, but also was or still is sold in Switzerland, Greece, Belarus, Russia, Indonesia, United States, Brazil, Japan and Argentina.

See also

 Tobacco smoking
 Tobacco
 Cigarette

References

Imperial Brands brands
Philip Morris brands
Finnish brands